A Girl with a Watering Can is an 1876 Impressionist  painting by Pierre-Auguste Renoir. The work was apparently painted in Claude Monet's famous garden at Argenteuil, and may portray one of the girls in Renoir's neighborhood in a blue dress holding a watering can.

The painting is exhibited at the National Gallery of Art, Washington, D.C.

Reference

External links

Paintings by Pierre-Auguste Renoir
1876 paintings
19th-century portraits
Portraits by French artists
Portraits of women
Collections of the National Gallery of Art
Paintings of children